Torsten Reißmann (born 23 February 1956 in Potsdam – 8 October 2009) was an East German judoka who competed in the late 1970s and the early 1980s. At the 1980 Summer Olympics in Moscow, he finished fifth in the half-lightweight event.

References

External links
 
 Maerkischeallgemeine.de article on Reißmann's death.  - accessed 14 October 2009.

1956 births
2009 deaths
German male judoka
Judoka at the 1980 Summer Olympics
Olympic judoka of East Germany
Sportspeople from Potsdam
20th-century German people
21st-century German people